Nisreen Ala-Din A. S. Alwan MBE is a British–Iraqi public health researcher who is a  Professor of Public Health at the University of Southampton. Her research considers maternal and child health. During the COVID-19 pandemic, Alwan used social media to communicate public health messages and to call for long covid to be counted and measured. In 2020, Alwan was selected as one of the BBC's top 100 Women.

Early life and education 
Alwan studied medicine at the University of Baghdad. During her studies she became interested in public health, and pursued a graduate degree in public health at the University of Nottingham. She joined the public health training programme in Yorkshire and the Humber, during which she was awarded a Wellcome Trust training fellowship. Alwan went on to earn a master's degree in statistical epidemiology and doctorate in nutritional epidemiology.

Research and career 
Alwan studies maternal and child health focusing on obesity and birth outcomes.

In the early days of the COVID-19 pandemic, Alwan became infected with coronavirus. This experience inspired her to become a more public-facing health campaigner. In particular, she made use of Twitter to communicate public health messages, and to lead a call for long COVID to be counted and reported in national data. Her efforts resulted in the broader medical community paying more attention to long COVID and how it presented clinically. She was part of a group of medics who wrote a letter to the government asking them to improve research and surveillance of long COVID. She wrote several opinion articles for Nature, The Huffington Post, The Lancet and The BMJ.

She has also spoken out about equality of treatment of women and ethnic minorities in academia and the public sphere.

Awards and honours 
2020 100 Women (BBC)
Member of the Order of the British Empire in the 2021 New Year Honours

Selected publications

References 

Living people
Year of birth missing (living people)
Public health researchers
University of Baghdad alumni
Alumni of the University of Nottingham
Alumni of the University of Leeds
Members of the Order of the British Empire
BBC 100 Women
Iraqi emigrants to the United Kingdom